Bill Walford (11 August 1947 – 5 November 2014) was an Australian rules footballer who played with Richmond and Fitzroy in the Victorian Football League (VFL).

Notes

External links 
		

2014 deaths
1947 births
Australian rules footballers from Victoria (Australia)
Richmond Football Club players
Fitzroy Football Club players